"Yankee Rose" is a song recorded by David Lee Roth, featuring the prominent electric guitar of its co-writer, virtuoso Steve Vai. Roth's first single on his 1986 first full-length solo LP Eat 'Em and Smile, with lyrical allusions to the American National Anthem and Irving Berlin's God Bless America, as well as July 4th, independence, flag unfurling, rocket flare, fire crackers, apple pie, and her torch light, it was recorded as a tribute to the Statue of Liberty, as the statue was completing a major renovation for the 100th anniversary of its dedication in 1886:

"coast to coast, sea to shining sea, hey sister, you're the perfect host"

"...nothing like her in the whole world"

The song was Roth's third Top 20 hit, the first two being covers of "California Girls" (peak #3) and "Just A Gigolo/I Ain't Got Nobody" (peak #12). "Yankee Rose" peaked at #16 on the Billboard Hot 100 chart.

It also appears as a radio tune on the 2002 video game Grand Theft Auto: Vice City on the rock station "V-Rock". A cover of the song is the title song for the video game Rumble Roses and Rumble Roses XX performed by Teresa James.

Music video
Despite the song's topic, there were no visual references to the Statue of Liberty, rather it was a band performance with much sexual innuendo, bumping and grinding, as well as Roth rump shaking and even simulating coital insertion and thrusting with his microphone.

It featured a comical prologue of a gold-medallion wearing, Indian convenience store clerk and various eccentric customers and their ensuing melodrama, as Bollywood type music plays in the background from his radio. A mismatched newlywed couple arguing about a hotel room; an African American woman in a lei covered-bikini, buying a dozen boxes of breath mints, who passionately rebukes the clerks advances, deriding him as "the last immigrant grocer on Earth"; an obese woman screaming about over the counter laxatives,  to which the clerk replies, "Not in my store you don't!"; a sleazy playboy in a suit (flanked by blondes in bikinis), played by Roth's co-creator Pete Angelus, and finally, David Lee Roth himself, shirtless, in the same blue and red tribal face paint seen on his LP cover, head feathers and a loin cloth holding a spear, demands "Give me a bottle of anything...and a glazed doughnut...to go," and cuts to the start of the song.

Charts

See also
 Yankee Rose, the last words in The Satanic Bible written by Anton Szandor LaVey

References 

1986 singles
David Lee Roth songs
Songs written by David Lee Roth
Song recordings produced by Ted Templeman
1986 songs
Songs written by Steve Vai
Warner Records singles